Ziernsee is a lake in the Mecklenburg Lake District, in Germany. Whilst most of the lake is in the district of Mecklenburgische Seenplatte (municipality Priepert) in the state of Mecklenburg-Vorpommern, a portion of its southern shore is in the state of Brandenburg. 

Navigation is administered as part of the Obere–Havel–Wasserstraße.

References 

Lakes of Mecklenburg-Western Pomerania
Lakes of Brandenburg
Federal waterways in Germany